The Samsung Galaxy J is a smartphone developed and manufactured by Samsung which works on the Android platform. This phone was originally developed for Japanese cellular carrier NTT DoCoMo in fall 2013, and the overseas version initially released in Taiwan in December 2013.
The device features a Qualcomm Snapdragon 800 Quad-Core 2.36 GHz processor with 3GB of RAM and a Full HD Super AMOLED display.

Specifications

Hardware
The phone is powered with Qualcomm's Snapdragon 800 chipset which includes 2.36 GHz processor, Adreno 330 GPU and 3GB RAM, with 32GB of internal storage and a 2600 mAh battery. The Galaxy J is fitted with a 5-inch Full HD Super AMOLED display and also includes a 13.2 MP rear camera with Power HCRI LED Flash and 2.1 MP front camera. The phone does not support USB 3.0 connectivity as compared to Samsung Galaxy Note 3.

Software
This phone was originally released with Android 4.3 Jelly Bean and now can be updated to Android 5.0 Lollipop.

See also
 List of Android devices
 Samsung Galaxy Note 3
 Nexus 5

References

Galaxy Core
Samsung smartphones
Android (operating system) devices
Mobile phones introduced in 2013
Mobile phones with user-replaceable battery
Mobile phones with infrared transmitter